The Ohio Philosophical Association is a philosophical organization founded in 1931 in Ohio, affiliated with the Ohio College Association. OPA promotes research in philosophy topics in Ohio colleges and universities.

External links 
OPA website

Philosophical societies in the United States
Organizations based in Ohio
Organizations established in 1931
1931 establishments in Ohio